Sweet, Soft N' Lazy (The Exclusive Collection) is the first compilation album by French-Belgian singer Viktor Lazlo.

The album was released following the success of Lazlo's German-French duet single Das erste Mal tat's noch weh with Stefan Waggershausen in Germany, Austria and Switzerland. The single peaked at No. 6 on the German single charts and was a massive success. The single Ansiedad was another success for Lazlo, charting in Germany and Belgium. It was also part of the official soundtrack for Lazlo's movie Boom Boom, a Spanish romantic comedy.

Track listing

Charts

Album

Single releases

References

1990 albums
Viktor Lazlo albums
Polydor Records albums